The Fourth Plague is a 1913  thriller novel by British writer Edgar Wallace.

Plot synopsis
An Italian criminal organisation, The Red Hand, threaten to release a deadly plague on Britain if their financial demands are not met.

References

Sources
 Clark, Neil. Stranger than Fiction: The Life of Edgar Wallace, the Man Who Created King Kong. The History Press, 2015.

1913 British novels
Novels by Edgar Wallace
British thriller novels